Bratovshchina is a rural locality (a selo) in Staroyashevsky Selsoviet, Kaltasinsky District, Bashkortostan, Russia. The population was 51 as of 2010. There are 3 streets.

Geography 
Bratovshchina is located 67 km northeast of Kaltasy (the district's administrative centre) by road. Staroyashevo is the nearest rural locality.

References 

Rural localities in Kaltasinsky District